Luka H. Garza (born December 27, 1998) is an American professional basketball player for the Minnesota Timberwolves of the National Basketball Association (NBA), on a two-way contract with the Iowa Wolves of the NBA G League.  He played college basketball for the Iowa Hawkeyes, where he was the consensus pick for national college player of the year for the 2020–21 season. As a junior, he was named a consensus first-team All-American and Big Ten Player of the Year. Garza played for Maret School in his hometown of Washington, D.C.

Early life and high school career
Garza grew up in Reston, Virginia, a suburb of Washington, D.C. He learned to play basketball from his father, Frank, who played for Idaho. Garza watched video tapes that his father collected of former National Basketball Association (NBA) post players like Kareem Abdul-Jabbar and attempted to recreate their moves.

In high school, Garza was coached by Chuck Driesell, son of Basketball Hall of Fame coach Lefty Driesell. In his senior season, he averaged 24.6 points, 11.7 rebounds and 2.5 blocks per game. Garza led Maret to the District of Columbia State Athletic Association (DCSAA) title game and earned D.C. Gatorade Player of the Year honors. He left as his school's all-time leading scorer, with 1,993 points.

Recruiting
He was a four-star recruit and chose to play college basketball for Iowa over offers from Georgetown, Georgia and Notre Dame, among others.

College career

Freshman season (2017–2018) 
In his college debut versus Chicago State, Garza had 16 points. He had his first double-double of 11 points and 13 rebounds the following game in a win over Alabama State and was named Big Ten freshman of the week. As a freshman, Garza averaged 12.1 points and 6.4 rebounds per game.

Sophomore season (2018–2019) 
Shortly before his sophomore season, Garza underwent surgery to remove a  cyst attached to his spleen. He also dealt with a sprained ankle in January 2019. In the NCAA Tournament, Garza had 20 points and seven rebounds to help Iowa upset Cincinnati. He averaged 13.1 points and 4.5 rebounds per game as a sophomore. Garza was named All-Big Ten honorable mention by the media.

Junior season (2019–2020) 
Garza scored 44 points, third-most in Iowa history, in a 103–91 loss to Michigan on December 6. He followed this up with 21 points and 10 rebounds in a 72–52 win over Minnesota and was named Oscar Robertson National Player of the Week. In an 84–68 win against Iowa State on December 12, Garza had a tooth jarred loose after taking an elbow from teammate Joe Wieskamp. Garza returned to the game and finished with 21 points and 11 rebounds. Garza had 34 points and 12 rebounds in a 89–86 loss to Penn State on January 4, 2020. He was named to the midseason watch lists for the Wooden Award, Naismith Trophy and Oscar Robertson Trophy. On February 13, Garza tallied 38 points, eight rebounds and four blocks in an 89–77 loss to Indiana. At the close of the regular season, he was named the Big Ten Player of the Year. He was then named National Player of the Year by the Sporting News. Garza averaged 23.9 points and 9.8 rebounds per game as a junior, earning consensus first-team All-American honors. Following the season, Garza declared for the 2020 NBA draft. On August 2, he announced he was withdrawing from the draft and returning to Iowa.

Senior season (2020–2021) 
On November 27, Garza scored a Carver–Hawkeye Arena-record 41 points, including 36 in the first half, on 14-of-15 shooting while posting nine rebounds and three blocks in a 103–76 win over Southern. He joined John Johnson as the only players in program history to record two 40-point games. In his next game, on December 3, Garza scored 30 first-half points as part of a 35-point, 10-rebound performance in a 99–58 victory over Western Illinois. On December 11, he posted 34 points and six three-pointers in a 105–77 win over Iowa State. Garza scored his 2,000th point in a February 2, 2021, win over Michigan State. On February 21, he recorded 23 points and 11 rebounds in a 74–68 victory over Penn State, surpassing Roy Marble to become Iowa's all-time leading scorer. After a win over the #25 Wisconsin Badgers, athletic director Gary Barta announced that they would be retiring #55 for Garza.

At the close of the season, Garza was again named Sporting News Player of the Year, becoming the first repeat winner since Michael Jordan in 1983 and 1984. He averaged 24.1 points and 8.7 rebounds as a senior, and became the first player in Iowa men's basketball history to twice be named Big Ten Player of the Year and consensus first-team All-American.

Professional career

Detroit Pistons (2021–2022) 
Garza was selected with the 52nd overall pick by the Detroit Pistons in the 2021 NBA draft. After a standout Summer League performance, Garza was signed to a two-way contract by the Pistons and their NBA G League affiliate, the Motor City Cruise. On September 24, the team announced they had converted his contract from a two-way to a standard deal.

On October 23, Garza made his NBA debut, posting three points, two rebounds, two steals and one assist across six minutes of play in a 97–82 loss to the Chicago Bulls. On November 23, Garza made his first career start, scoring seven points on 3-of-5 shooting from the field and 1-of-1 from three, in addition to three rebounds and two assists in a 100–92 loss to the Miami Heat. On December 26, Garza scored a career-high 20 points on 7-of-14 shooting from the field and 2-of-5 from three, to go along with six rebounds and two assists before fouling out in a 144–109 blowout loss to the San Antonio Spurs. On January 1, 2022, Garza logged his first career double-double with a career-high tying 20 points and a career-high 14 rebounds across a career-high 40 minutes of action in a 117–116 win over the Spurs. Together with teammates Hamidou Diallo and Saddiq Bey, they became the first trio in league history to register 20 points and 14 rebounds in the same game in over 40 years. On June 29, the Pistons declined their team option on Garza, making him a free agent.

In July 2022, Garza joined the Portland Trail Blazers for the 2022 NBA Summer League.

Minnesota Timberwolves (2022–present) 
On August 23, 2022, Garza signed with the Minnesota Timberwolves. On October 15, 2022, the Timberwolves converted his deal to a two-way contract. Garza was named captain of Team Luka for the G League's inaugural Next Up Game for the 2022–23 season. He was named the MVP of the game after leading his team to a 178–162 win over Team Scoot, logging 23 points and eight rebounds.

National team career
In September 2020, Garza expressed his interest to represent the Bosnia and Herzegovina national team internationally. In December 2021, he told a reporter that he finished the process of obtaining dual citizenship.

Career statistics

NBA

|-
| style="text-align:left;"| 
| style="text-align:left;"| Detroit
| 32 || 5 || 12.2 || .449 || .327 || .623 || 3.1 || 0.6 || 0.3 || 0.2 || 5.8
|-
| style="text-align:left;"| 
| style="text-align:left;"| Minnesota
| 24 || 0 || 8.9 || .534 || .361 || .800 || 2.4 || 0.6 || 0.1 || 0.1 || 6.8
|- class="sortbottom"
| style="text-align:center;" colspan="2"| Career
| 56 || 5 || 10.8 || .484 || .341 || .703 || 2.8 || 0.6 || 0.2 || 0.1 || 6.2

College

|-
| style="text-align:left;"| 2017–18
| style="text-align:left;"| Iowa
| 33 || 26 || 21.7 || .557 || .348 || .681 || 6.4 || 1.1 || .3 || 1.0 || 12.1
|-
| style="text-align:left;"| 2018–19
| style="text-align:left;"| Iowa
| 32 || 30 || 23.7 || .531 || .292 || .804 || 4.5 || .9 || .3 || .5 || 13.1
|-
| style="text-align:left;"| 2019–20
| style="text-align:left;"| Iowa
| 31 || 31 || 32.0 || .542 || .358 || .651 || 9.8 || 1.2 || .8 || 1.8 || 23.9
|-
| style="text-align:left;"| 2020–21
| style="text-align:left;"| Iowa
| 31 || 31 || 31.5 || .553 || .440 || .709 || 8.7 || 1.7 || .7 || 1.6 || 24.1
|- class="sortbottom"
| style="text-align:center;" colspan="2"| Career
| 127 || 118 || 27.1 || .546 || .367 || .701 || 7.3 || 1.2 || .5 || 1.2 || 18.2

Personal life
Garza's father is of Spanish American origin, and his mother is from Bosnia and Herzegovina, of Bosniak origin. Both of Garza's parents have basketball experience: his father, Frank, played collegiately at Idaho, and his mother, Šejla (née Muftić), played professionally in Europe. His paternal grandfather, James Halm, played college basketball for Hawaii. His maternal uncle, Teoman Alibegović, was the all-time leading scorer for the Slovenia national basketball team.
His cousins Amar Alibegović, 
Mirza Alibegović and Denis Alibegović are all professional basketball players in Europe. 
His maternal grandfather, was an accomplished association football goalkeeper, spending his entire career with FK Sarajevo.

Garza's mother is also an executive assistant at the Embassy of Bosnia and Herzegovina in Washington, D.C.

References

External links

Iowa Hawkeyes bio

1998 births
Living people
All-American college men's basketball players
American men's basketball players
American people of Bosnia and Herzegovina descent
American people of Bosniak descent
American people of Spanish descent
Bosnia and Herzegovina men's basketball players
Bosnia and Herzegovina people of American descent
Basketball players from Washington, D.C.
Big Ten Athlete of the Year winners
Centers (basketball)
Detroit Pistons draft picks
Detroit Pistons players
Iowa Hawkeyes men's basketball players
Iowa Wolves players
Motor City Cruise players
National Basketball Association players from Bosnia and Herzegovina
Power forwards (basketball)